is a Japanese voice actor and singer who won the 4th and 9th Seiyu Awards for best lead actor for his role as Sebastian Michaelis in Black Butler, Jotaro Kujo in JoJo's Bizarre Adventure and Shukuro Tsukishima in Bleach, as well as "Best Personalities" at the 9th Seiyu Awards. Other notable roles include Erwin Smith in Attack on Titan, Seishū Handa in Barakamon, Silver the Hedgehog in Sonic the Hedgehog, Drole in The Seven Deadly Sins, Shizuo Heiwajima in Durarara!!, Jyushimatsu in Osomatsu-san,  Shintarō Midorima in Kuroko's Basketball, Subaru Asahina in Brothers Conflict, Hades Aidoneus in Kamigami no Asobi, Killer T Cell in Cells at Work! and Ushiromiya Battler in Umineko When They Cry and Nobuyuki Sanada in Samurai Warriors 4 and Warriors Orochi 4. Ono was also featured in The King of Fighters 2002: Unlimited Match as Nameless and the announcer of the game. He hosts radio show Dear Girl: Stories along with voice actor Hiroshi Kamiya.

Biography
Ono graduated from Kōchi High School, Nihon University College of Art (Department of Broadcasting), and Aoni Coaching School Sunday Class. At university, he initially studied TV show production, but failed to succeed in directing a large group of people. Later, he switched to radio program production, and during the creation of a radio drama, became a performer due to a shortage of staff, which led him to pursue voice acting. In 2007, he started his music career under his own name with the mini-album Hinemosu. Since 2008, he has been performing at the "Original Entertainment Paradise" held at the end of every year as one of the hosts and the leader. The other hosts are Showtaro Morikubo, Kenichi Suzumura, and Takuma Terashima.

In 2008, he won the 2nd Seiyu Award for Best Actor in a Supporting Role and won the 4th award in 2010. In 2011, he won the Grand Prix at the 33rd Animage Anime Grand Prix in the voice acting category.

In 2015, Ono won the 9th Seiyu Award for Best Actor in a Leading Role and Personality, the BEST COMFORT RADIO Healing Radio Award for the TV anime Barakamons web radio Radikamon, which he was a personality for at the 1st Aniradi Awards, and the Voice Actor Award at the Tokyo Anime Award Festival 2015, Anime of the Year Category.

In February 2016, Ono left Mausu Promotion, to which he belonged for many years, and started his freelance career.

Filmography

Animated series

Original net animation (ONA)
Monster Strike (2016), Haruma Kagutsuchi
Planetarian: The Reverie of a Little Planet (2016), Junker
Levius (2019), Hugo Stratas
Beyblade Burst Dynamite Battle (2021), Rashad Goodman
Pokémon Evolutions (2021), Dande (Leon)
JoJo's Bizarre Adventure: Stone Ocean (2021–22), Jotaro Kujo, Jotaro Kujo Look-alike
Gaiken Shijō Shugi (2022), Takahito Saitama

Original video animation (OVA)2003Mizuiro, Kenji's father2004Top wo Nerae!2, Crew A, Operator B, Governor
Memories Off 3.5 To the Distant Memories, Ishū Sagisawa
Memories Off 3.5 The Moment of Wishing, Ishū Sagisawa2005Case Closed: The Target is Kogoro Mouri!! The Detective Boys' Secret Investigation, Masaya Murakami
Majokko Tsukune-chan, Tony Ojisan, Kuma2006Baldr Force EXE Resolution, Yosuke Kashiwagi
Mobile Suit Gundam SEED C.E. 73: Stargazer, Sven Cal Bayan2008Mahou Sensei Negima ~Shiroki Tsubasa Ala Alba~, Albireo Imma
My Bride Is a Mermaid, Kai Mikawa
Zombie-Loan, Shuuji Tsugumi2009Higurashi no Naku Koro ni, Mamoru Akasaka
Minami-ke Betsubara, Hosaka
Mahou Sensei Negima ~Mou Hitotsu no Sekai~, Albireo Imma
Saint Seiya: The Lost Canvas, Cancer Manigoldo2010Kuroshitsuji: Ciel In Wonderland Part 1, Sebastian Michaelis
Kuroshitsuji: Welcome To The Phantomhives, Sebastian Michaelis
Yozakura Quartet ~Hoshi no Umi~, Kyōsuke Kishi2011Kuroshitsuji: Ciel In Wonderland Part 2, Sebastian Michaelis
Kuroshitsuji: His Butler, Performer, Sebastian Michaelis
Kuroshitsuji: The Making Of Kuroshitsuji II, Sebastian Michaelis
VitaminX Addiction, Hajime Kusanagi2012A Channel, Satou Sensei
Minami-ke Omatase, Hosaka
Rinne no Lagrange: Kamogawa Days, Dizelmine Fin E Ld Si2013Minami-ke Natsu Yasumi, Hosaka
Yozakura Quartet ~Hana no Uta~, Kyōsuke Kishi2014Attack on Titan: No Regrets, Erwin Smith
Kuroshitsuji: Book of Murder, Sebastian Michaelis
Magi: Adventure of Sinbad, Sinbad
Noragami, Daikoku
Yamada-kun and the Seven Witches OVA, Ushio Igarashi
Uta no Prince-sama Maji LOVE Revolutions (Season 3), Sumeragi Kira (HE★VENS)

Animated films
The Disappearance of Haruhi Suzumiya (2010), Itsuki Koizumi
The Princess and the Pilot (2011)
009 Re:Cyborg (2012), Jet Link
Nerawareta Gakuen (2012), Ryouichi Kyougoku
Mardock Scramble:The Third Exhaust (2012), Marlowe John Fever
K: Missing Kings (2014), Kuroh Yatogami
New Initial D the Movie: Legend 1 - Awakening (2014), Ryosuke Takahashi
Gantz: O (2016), Masaru Kato
In This Corner of the World (2016), Tetsu Mizuhara
Planetarian: Storyteller of the Stars (2016), Hoshi no Hito (young)
Pop in Q (2016)
Kuroko's Basketball The Movie: Last Game (2017), Shintarō Midorima
Black Butler: Book of the Atlantic (2017), Sebastian Michaelis
Godzilla: Planet of the Monsters (2017), Eliott Leland
Detective Conan: The Crimson Love Letter (2017), Muga Iori
Batman Ninja (2018), Nightwing
K: Seven Stories (2018), Kuroh Yatogami

"JoJo's Bizarre Adventure 2015" "Jotaro Kujo"

Mr. Osomatsu: The Movie (2019), Jūshimatsu Matsuno
Free! Road to the World - the Dream (2019), Kaede Kinjou
Violence Voyager (2019), Takaaki
Digimon Adventure: Last Evolution Kizuna (2020), Kyōtarō Imura
Blue Thermal (2022), Yō Asahina
Mr. Osomatsu: Hipipo-Zoku to Kagayaku Kajitsu (2022), Jūshimatsu Matsuno
Backflip!! (2022), Masamune Shichigahama
Kukuriraige -Sanxingdui Fantasy- (TBD), Sauda

Video games
Way of the Samurai (2002) - Don Donatelouse
Higurashi no Naku Koro ni Matsuri (–14) − Mamoru Akasaka
Ys I & II: Eternal Story − Goto
Full House Kiss − Kujo Riku
Dororo − Kanekozo
Planetarian: The Reverie of a Little Planet − Junker
Fu-un Bakumatsu-den − Sakamoto Ryōma
Full House Kiss 2 − Kujo Riku, Nakaizumi Takayuki
Mobile Suit Gundam Seed Destiny: Federation vs. Z.A.F.T. II − Sven Cal Bayang
Kamiwaza − Ebizou
Kengo Zero − Sakamoto Ryōma
Sonic Rivals − Silver the Hedgehog
Armored Core 4 − Amazigh
Sonic the Hedgehog − Silver the Hedgehog
Sonic and the Secret Rings − Silver the Hedgehog
Mobile Suit Gundam: MS Sensen 0079 − Klaus Beltran
Sonic Rivals 2 − Silver the Hedgehog
The Promise of Haruhi Suzumiya – Itsuki Koizumi
Sonic Riders: Zero Gravity − Silver the Hedgehog
The Perplexity of Haruhi Suzumiya – Itsuki Koizumi
Duel Love − Kyoji Takigawa
Chaos;Head − Daisuke Misumi
Mana-Khemia 2: Ochita Gakuen to Renkinjutsushi-tachi − Rozeluxe Meitzen
Street Fighter IV games (–14) – El Fuerte
Sigma Harmonics − Kurogami Shiguma
Neo Angelique Special – Hyuga
Cross Edge − Rozeluxe Meitzen
The Last Remnant, David Nassau
Monochrome Factor Cross Road − Akira Nikaidou
Tatsunoko vs. Capcom − Casshern
Enkaku Sōsa: Shinjitsu e no 23 Nichikan − Kouji Saitou
The King of Fighters 2002: Unlimited Match − Announcer, Nameless
Kuroshitsuji: Phantom and Ghost − Sebastian Michaelis
Starry☆Sky~in Spring~ − Tohzuki Suzuya
Luminous Arc 3 − Lefi
Final Fantasy XIII − Snow Villiers
Spider-Man: Shattered Dimensions − Spider-Man 2099
Sonic Colors – Silver the Hedgehog
Starry☆Sky~After Spring~ − Tohzuki Suzuya
Umineko: When They Cry – Battler Ushiromiya, Kinzo Ushiromiya (young)
Ōgon Musōkyoku − Battler Ushiromiya
The Reminiscence of Haruhi Suzumiya – Itsuki Koizumi
The Mahjong of Suzumiya Haruhi-chan – Itsuki Koizumi
Ōgon Musōkyoku X − Battler Ushiromiya
Final Fantasy Type-0 − Nine
Sonic Generations − Silver the Hedgehog
Final Fantasy XIII-2 − Snow Villiers
Ōgon Musōkyoku CROSS − Battler Ushiromiya, Black Battler
Genso Suikoden: Tsumugareshi Hyakunen no Toki − Torwald Albarek
Zero Escape: Virtue's Last Reward − K
Fire Emblem Awakening − Frederick, Priam
Brothers Conflict: Passion Pink − Subaru Asahina
Devil Summoner: Soul Hackers – Shingo Sako / Six
Bravely Default – Victor S. Court
Muvluv Alternative Total Eclipse − Yūya Buriajisu
Norn9 − Azuma Natsuhiko
JoJo's Bizarre Adventure: All Star Battle − Jotaro Kujo
Etrian Odyssey Untold: The Millennium Girl − Simon Yorke
Brothers Conflict: Brilliant Blue − Subaru Asahina
Lightning Returns: Final Fantasy XIII − Snow Villiers
Granblue Fantasy − Altair, Poseidon
 Dengeki Bunko: Fighting Climax – Shizuo Heiwajima
Samurai Warriors 4 − Nobuyuki Sanada
Tales of Zestiria − Dezel
Dragon Quest Heroes – Psaro
Final Fantasy Type-0 HD − Nine
Norn9: Last Era – Natsuhiko Azuma
Fire Emblem Fates − Suzukaze
7th Dragon III: Code VFD – Player (Male)
JoJo's Bizarre Adventure: Eyes of Heaven − Jotaro Kujo
100 Sleeping Princes and the Kingdom of Dreams (2015) - Apollo, Sebastian
Attack on Titan − Erwin Smith
Skullgirls 2nd Encore − Beowulf
Zero Escape: Zero Time Dilemma − Sigma
Norn9: Act Tune – Natsuhiko Azuma
World of Final Fantasy − Snow Villiers
Samurai Warriors: Spirit of Sanada – Nobuyuki Sanada
Osomatsu-san the Game: Hachamecha Shūshoku Advice – Dead or Work – Jyushimatsu Matsuno
Valkyria: Azure Revolution − Amleth Glenkaer
Fire Emblem Heroes − Frederick, Suzukaze
Dissidia Final Fantasy Opera Omnia (2017) − Snow Villiers
Osomatsu-san the Game: Hachamecha shuushoku adobaisu - Deddo oa wâku – Jyushimatsu Matsuno
Fire Emblem Warriors – Frederick
Sonic Forces − Silver the Hedgehog
Neo Angelique: Angel's Tears – Hyuga
Warriors Orochi 4 – Nobuyuki Sanada
Jump Force − Jotaro Kujo
Dissidia Final Fantasy NT − Snow Villiers
Saint Seiya Awakening – Julian Solo/Poseidon
Team Sonic Racing – Silver the Hedgehog
Pokémon Masters EX – Grimsley, Brycen
JoJo's Bizarre Adventure: Last Survivor – Jotaro Kujo
The King of Fighters All Star – Nameless
Shin Megami Tensei III: Nocturne HD Remaster – Hikawa
The Legend of Heroes: Kuro no Kiseki – Van Arkride
Alchemy Stars – Fafnir
The Legend of Heroes: Kuro no Kiseki II – Crimson Sin – Van Arkride, Grendel
Dragon Quest Treasures – Shady, Monsters
Unknown date
Asaki, Yumemishi (?) − Yaegaki Chihaya

Hoshi no Furu Toki (?) − Toshi Arima
Ijiwaru My Master (?) − Evans
KoiGIG〜DEVIL×ANGEL〜 (?) − Shuu
Little Aid (?) − Yuzuru Sawato
Mahou Tsukai to Goshujin sama (?) − Seras Dragoon
Mizu no Senritsu (?) − Masatsugu Kirihara
Mizu no Senritsu Tsūhi no Kioku (?) − Masatsugu Kirihara
Panic Palette (?) − Yuzuru Sawato
Princess Nightmare (?) − Ichirouta Inukai

R.O.H.A.N. (?) − Half-elf
Vitamin series, Hajime Kusanagi
VitaminX (?)
VitaminX Evolution (?)
VitaminY (?)
VitaminZ (?)

Live action

Air ~prelude~
Air MEMORIES
Farewell, Kamen Rider Den-O: Final Countdown
ETERNAL VALENTINE in HOTEL MAUSU
STARCHILD Presents 〜Starchild Collection〜

2006
Neo Romance Ala Mode 2

2007
Fullhouse Kiss Shokei Festival 2007
Neo Romance Live Hot! 10 count down Radio ROCKET PUNCH
Neo Romance Festa Summer 2007
Suzumiya Haruhi no Gekisou
Vitamin X Ikuzee! Tokimeki ★ Full Burst

2008
Fullhouse Kiss Shokei Festival 2008
Original Entertainment Paradise "OREPARA" 2008 LIVE DVD
Vitamin X Ikuzee! Tokimeki ★ Full Burst EVOLUTION

2009
Kuroshitsuji "Sono Shitsuji, Shuushou ~Saigo no Bansan wo Anata to Tomo ni~"
Original Entertainment Paradise "OREPARA" 2009 LIVE DVD

2010
Kuroshitsuji "Sono Shitsuji, Kyoso ~Akai Valentine~" Event DVD"

2018
 Hanbun, Aoi, Kagami yo Kagami (voice)

2022
Mr. Osomatsu, Jūshimatsu (voice)

Radio

Ono Daisuke no GIG ra Night! (Internet radio・RADIO Kansai, Ltd.)
Kamiya Hiroshi・Ono Daisuke no DearGirl〜Stories〜 (Nippon Cultural Broadcasting)
Neoromance・Live HOT! 10 Count down Radio II Huu!
Lucky ☆ Channel (34th and 35th broadcast)

BLCDs

Aishiteru (Youko Fujitani), Ichise Kazushi
Animamundi
Binan no Dendou Series, Christian Bernadotte
Bitter Valentine
Chintsubu Series: Chinko no Tsubuyaki Hiroo (V2)
Doki Doki Renai
Dorei Series
Furachi na Koi no Prince
Hanafurirou Series
Hanayome Series, Shino
Hanayome wa Nido Sarawareru
Himegimi no Koshiire
Honoka na Koi no Danpen wo, Shenjin
Iro Otoko, Chouji Ishikawa
Iro Otoko ~Kyoudai Hen~, Chouji Ishikawa
Kazahana
Kotonoha no Hana Series 1: Kotonoha no Hana, Shuichi Hasebe
Kotonoha no Hana Series 2: Kotonoha no Sekai, Shuu
Miwaku no Ringo, Ichijou Rei
Name of Love, Kouhei
Omae wa, Ai wo Kuu Kedamono
Ore no Aniki ni Te o Dasu na
Reload, Keiji Kazuma
Renai Days ~Hitotsu Yane no Shita~
Renai Keiyaku Series
Rossellini Ke no Musuko Series, Akira Hayase
Ryuu to Ryuu Series
S de Gomen ne
Sayonara wo Iu Ki wa Nai Series
Shinkan wa Ou ni Aisareru Series
Shinkuu Yuusetsu Series
Shugoreisama ni Tsuitekoi ♥ (Protection Spirit in the Way of Love)
Soshite Koi ga Hajimaru
Super Lovers, Shima Kaidou
Toriko ni Saseru Kiss o Shiyou
Toritsu Mahou Gakuen, Kouji Yuno
Toukaidou Hisame ~Kagerou~, Hibiki
Yasashiku Koroshite, Boku no Kokoro wo
Yumemiru Seiza/Saredo Utsukushiki Hibi - Beautiful Days section, Class President
Yumemiru Seiza/Natsu no Michishirube - Summer Landmarks section, Minoru
Yuuwaku Recipe series, Takuro
Ze, Ryuusei

Other drama CDs

Asagaya Zippy, John
Buso Renkin, Homunculus Satou
Category: Freaks, Naoki Amano
Idolmaster: Xenoglossia series, Naraba Daidō:
Idolmaster: Xenoglossia Original Drama Vol. 2
Idolmaster: Xenoglossia Original Drama Vol. 3

Karensakakōkō Karenhōsōbu, Tōru Sakaki
Karneval, Hirato
Kaze no Stigma, Kazuma Yagami
KoiGIG-Let It Bleed-, Shuu
Kuroshitsuji, Sebastian Michaelis
Magical Girl Lyrical Nanoha StrikerS Sound Stage, Verossa Acous
The Melancholy of Haruhi Suzumiya: Sound Around, Itsuki Koizumi
Memories Off, Ishū Sagisawa
Monochrome Factor, Akira Nikaidou
Neo Angelique series, Hyuga:
Neo Angelique 〜Silent Doll〜
Neo Angelique 〜My First Lady〜
Neo Angelique 〜Romantic Gift〜
Neo Angelique 〜Tasoga no Kishi〜
Neo Angelique 〜Akatsuki no Tenshi〜
Oresama Teacher, Yuuto Maizono
Rust Blaster, Aldred Van Envrio
Sacrificial Princess and the King of Beasts,
Shinakoi, Ryuunosuke Sakaki
S.L.H Stray Love Hearts!, Kuga Reizei
Special A, Aoi Ogata
Starry Sky ~in Spring~, Tohzuki Suzuya
VitaminX series, Hajime Kusanagi:
Ultra Vitamin
Ultra Vitamin II -Maximum Baka-

Zombie-Loan, Shuuji Tsugumi

Tokusatsu
Kamen Rider Den-O - Teddy
Ultraman Taiga - Opening Narrator/Taiga Spark Announcement

Dubbing roles

Live action
The Broken Hearts Gallery, Nick (Dacre Montgomery)
Dolittle, Chee-Chee (Rami Malek)
Doctor Strange, Karl Mordo (Chiwetel Ejiofor)
Doctor Strange in the Multiverse of Madness, Karl Mordo (Chiwetel Ejiofor)
Elvis, Elvis Presley (Austin Butler)
Enthiran, Dr. Vasigaran / Chitti (Rajinikanth)
The Fate of the Furious, Eric Reisner (Scott Eastwood)
Five Fingers, Martijn (Ryan Phillippe)
Gotham, James Gordon (Ben McKenzie)
The High Note, David Cliff (Kelvin Harrison Jr.)
It Chapter Two, Ben Hanscom (Jay Ryan)
Jexi, Brody (Justin Hartley)
Kite, Oburi (Callan McAuliffe)
Leonardo, Leonardo da Vinci (Aidan Turner)
Little Miss Sunshine, Dwayne Hoover (Paul Dano)
The Man, Booty (Anthony Mackie)
The Man Who Invented Christmas, Charles Dickens (Dan Stevens)
The Matrix Revolutions, Sequoia (Toby Onwumere)
MotherFatherSon, Caden Finch (Billy Howle)
The O.C., Ryan Atwood (Ben McKenzie)
Pacific Rim: Uprising, Nathan Lambert (Scott Eastwood)
Pee Mak, Mak (Mario Maurer)
Running Wild with Bear Grylls, Bear Grylls
Shazam!, Adult Freddy Freeman (Adam Brody)
Shazam! Fury of the Gods, Adult Freddy Freeman (Adam Brody)
Teenage Mutant Ninja Turtles: Out of the Shadows, Casey Jones (Stephen Amell)
Wonder Woman, Steve Trevor (Chris Pine)
Wonder Woman 1984, Steve Trevor (Chris Pine)

Animation
Adventure Time, Prince Gumball
The Croods, Guy
The Croods: A New Age, Guy
Epic, Nod
Lookism, Jin Ho Bin/Takahito Saitama
Love, Death & Robots, Liang
Transformers: Cyberverse, Backbite
X-Men: Evolution, Alex Summers

Discography

Personal works

Character song CD

2006Full House Kiss ~ Single Collection Vol. 13｢Seishun Aftermath｣ (with Kenichi Suzumura)Neo Angelique ~ My First Lady｢Shikon no Kadou｣Tensei Hakken Fuumoroku ~ Aratanaru Kage｢Treasure In My Heart ~Kokoro No Takaramono~｣

2007Kamen Rider Den-O ~｢Chou Climax Jump｣｢Chou Climax Jump｣ (with Kenichi Suzumura, Toshihiko Seki, Koji Yusa, Dori Sakurada, Tamaki Matsumoto,  Rina Akiyama, Kenjirō Ishimaru & Masaki Terasoma)KoiGIG ~DEVIL×ANGEL~ Battle Love｢Battle Love｣｣ (with Hisayoshi Suganuma, Wataru Hatano & Koichi Tochika )KoiGIG ~DEVIL×ANGEL~ ROAD THAT BELIEVE｢Aoi Shiroki Tsuki No Noroi｣
｢Fly to the victory road｣Mamoru-kun ni Megami no Shukufuku wo! Original Character Song Disk 1｢東ビ王誕生！｣(with Akiko Kimura, Mikako Takahashi, Mamiko Noto, Kimiko Koyama, Saeko Chiba, Yuki Iguchi, Fuyuka Oura & Shintaro Ohata)Mamoru-kun ni Megami no Shukufuku wo! Original Character Song Disk 4｢ああ東ビ戦隊マヤレンジャー｣ (with Akiko Kimura, Mikako Takahashi, Mamiko Noto, Kimiko Koyama, Saeko Chiba, Yuki Iguchi, Fuyuka Oura & Shintaro Ohata)Mamoru-kun ni Megami no Shukufuku wo! Original Character Song Disk 5｢You are NO.1｣ (with Akiko Kimura, Shintaro Ohata, Taku Kimura & Taiten Kusunoki)Princess Nightmare ~ Character Song Vol.1｢Omae Dake no Hero｣Suzumiya Haruhi no Yuutsu Character Song VOL.8｢Hare Hare Yukai (Itsuki Koizumi ver.)｣
｢Maggaare Spectacle｣Vitamin X ~ Diamond Single｢Houkago Eden ~Diamond Ver｣ (with Tatsuhisa Suzuki)
｢Shooting Star ~Diamond Ver｣ (with Tatsuhisa Suzuki)

2008Dear My Sun!!｢Shigatsu No Kaze｣ (with Hiroki Shimowada & Hiroshi Okamoto)Dragonaut ~ Character Song Vol. 1｢Tenohira no Naka no Kiseki｣Dragonaut ~ Character Song Vol. 5｢Venus! Venus!｣Hanayoi Romanesque ~ Saigo No Piece｢Saigo No Piece｣ (with Hikaru Midorikawa)Higurashi no Naku Koro ni Kai ~ Irie-tachi no Gyakushuu｢BUCHIKAMACE 徹甲弾！｣Kuroshitsuji Character Song ｢Sono Shitsuji, Kashou｣｢Anata no Koe ga Iroaseyou Tomo, Meiyaku no Uta ga Sono mune ni Todokimasu you ni｣
｢Tsuki no Ame｣Monochrome Factor ED ~ AWAKE ~Boku no Subete~｢Awake Boku no Subete｣ (with Hiroshi Kamiya)Monochrome Factor Character Song Factor 1. Akira｢Destiny｣Monochrome Factor PS2 Cross Road OST｢AWAKE ~Boku no Subete~ Another Side｣Neo Angelique ~ Sincerely｢Tsukibae no Yasouku｣Neo Angelique Abyss ~ Joy To The World｢Joy To The World｣ (with Hiroki Takahashi, Toru Ohkawa & Masaya Onosaka)
｢Platonic Garden｣ (with Hiroki Takahashi, Toru Ohkawa & Masaya Onosaka)Neo Angelique Abyss Character Song~ Scene 05｢Rinka no Shiku｣Neo Angelique Abyss ~Second Age~ Silent Destiny｢Eternal Green~Kimi to iu Eien｣ (with Hiroki Takahashi, Toru Ohkawa & Masaya Onosaka)
｢Silent Destiny｣ (with Hiroki Takahashi, Toru Ohkawa & Masaya Onosaka)Neo Angelique Abyss ~ Sunshine Party｢PROUD YOU｣ (with Daisuke Hirakawa)
｢Sunshine Party｣ (with Daisuke Hirakawa)Neo Angelique Abyss ~ Variety 1｢Obuhanta 5 no Theme｣｣ (with Hiroki Takahashi, Toru Ohkawa, Masaya Onosaka & Aya Endo)Petit Four ~ Character CD Vol. 2｢Renjyo｣
｢IINO?｣(Daisuke Ono & Shinnosuke Tachibana)My Bride Is a Mermaid｢Psychedelic Brother｣ (with Masashi Yabe)Shina Dark: Kuroki Tsuki no ou to Soheiki no Himegimi｢Oukoku Machi Wa Tongue Hawk Turn｣ (with Kana Hanazawa, Ayako Kawasumi & Hiroki Yasumoto)Suzumiya Haruhi no Yuutsu Shin ~ Character Song VOL.4｢"Tsumaranai Hanashi desu yo" to boku ha iu｣
｢Tada no Himitsu｣True Fortune ~ Uranai Hanasanai Kaesanai｢Uranai Hanasanai Kaesanai｣(with Mamoru Miyano, Tomokazu Sugita, Hikaru Midorikawa, Kisho Taniyama & Hisafumi Oda)
｢Uranai Hanasanai Kaesanai Ver.2｣ (with Mamoru Miyano)Vitamin X ~ Greatest Hits ~｢Houkago Eden｣ (with Tatsuhisa Suzuki)
｢Kindan Secret Romance｣ (with Tatsuhisa Suzuki)
｢Kizu Darake No Eternity｣
｢Mayonaka kyuseisyu｣ (with Tatsuhisa Suzuki)
｢Shooting Star｣ (with Tatsuhisa Suzuki)

2009Kura Noah ~Cry No More~ Boku to Kimi No Sekai｢Cry No More ~Boku to Kimi No Sekai｣ (with Hiro Shimono)Kura Noah ~Cry No More~ Love & Heaven/Blooming Moon｢Love & Heaven｣Minami-ke ~ Character Song Best Album｢No Problem｣
｢Curry Song｣ (with Minori Chihara)Miracle ☆ Train Vol. 4 ~Izayoi Tsukishima｢Home Station｣
｢Senro ha hashiru 6 no ji ni ~ Ooedo-sen he youkoso ~ Tsukishima ver.~｣Neo Angelique Special ~ Platinum Harmony｢Home Sweetest Home｣ (with Toru Ohkawa)
｢Treasure Tomorrow｣ (with Hiroki Takahashi, Toru Ohkawa, Masaya Onosaka, Kappei Yamaguchi & Daisuke Hirakawa)
｢Kurenai no Rondo｣｣ (with Kappei Yamaguchi)
｢Kiseki~The Brilliant Days｣Nyoron☆Churuya-san ~ YouTube Anime Session Image CD.3｢Machigatte Sumochitaberu｣ (with Yuki Matsuoka)Rikei Danshi. Benkyo ni Naru!? Character Song 1 Vol.4｢Genshibunshi MAIN ~ Bokura no Rikashitsu (Soroba Jon ver.)｣
｢Mayoi no Nucleotide｣Suzumiya Haruhi-chan no Yuutsu ~ OP&ED Ima made no Arasuji｢Atogaki You na Mono｣ (with Tomokazu Sugita, Aya Hirano, Minori Chihara & Yuko Goto)
｢Ima made no Arasuji｣ (with Tomokazu Sugita, Aya Hirano, Minori Chihara & Yuuko Goto)Original Drama Series 響演 第6弾「Wish」「Type two」

2010Durarara!! DVD Vol.3 Tokuten Cover Song Collection of Shizuo Heiwajima｢Tsugaru Kaikyo Fuyugeshiki｣FULL SCORE Vol 04 ~ Mixture｢Borderless Music!!!｣ (with Koji Yusa, Mamoru Miyano, Daisuke Hirakawa, Hiroyuki Yoshino & Kisho Taniyama)Kamen Rider Den-O ~｢Chou Jump Double-Action Strike form｣｢Double-Action Strike form｣(with Dori Sakurada)
｢Double-Action Strike form ~ Teddy Ver.｣Kuroshitsuji II ~ Character Song Vol. 1 ｢Kuroshitsuji, Nessou｣｢You will rule the world｣
｢Aru Shitsuji no Nichijou｣Mahou Sensei Negima! Mou Hitotsu no Sekai ~ Theme Song Collection｢Get a Chance！｣ (with Rikiya Koyama, Marina Inoue, Rina Satou, Yumi Shimura, Yuki Matsuoka & Masahito Yabe)Quin Rose ~ Wizard and The Master ~ Une etoile｢Jekyll to Hyde｣Riaru_Riaru ga_Anriaru｢Riaru_Riaru ga_Anriaru｣ (with Sayuri Gotou)
｢少年少女達成団｣ (with Sayuri Gotou)Rikei Danshi. Benkyo ni Naru!? ~ Character song 2 Vol.1｢Youryokuso tai ~Boku to kimi to midori to hikari~｣
｢Shinkaron☆Miracle｣
｢fellow Sozoro follow｣ (with Nobuhiko Okamoto)

"Key / Missing You" – as Jangled Cat. Opening song for Psychic Detective Yakumo. Reached No. 36 in Oricon charts.
｢Key ~ Phase 1｣
｢Key ~ Phase 2｣
｢Key｣Uragiri Wa Boku No Namae Wo Shitteiru ~ Original Drama Vol.4｢O.A.T.H｣Vitamin X ~ Evolution Plus「一撃SN†PER」｢一撃SNIPER｣ (with Tatsuhisa Suzuki)
｢一撃SNIPER ~ Hajime Ver｣Working!! Ending Theme
｢Heart no Edge ni Idomou｣ (with Jun Fukuyama & Hiroshi Kamiya)

2011A Channel｢Kimi no Te｣Densetsu no Yusha no Densetsu ~ Character Song Sion｢Hikari to Kattou no Shoushitsuten｣Densetsu no Yusha no Densetsu ~ Blu-ray Vol.12｢君思う空の下｣ (with Jun Fukuyama)Minami-ke Vol. 9 ~ Drama CD + Character songs｢Let's Oyasai｣ (with Minori Chihara)Otomen Charity Song Project ~Brand New Love~｢Ever Smile｣ SHOW&KENN with ALL FRIENDS (with Kenn, Kenji Nojima, Showtaro Morikubo, Tsubasa Yonaga, Hiroaki Miura & Tomoaki Maeno)Rikei Danshi. Benkyo ni Naru!? ~ Character song 3｢Fall in love 完了!｣
｢30 minutes Shootin' Star｣ (with Hiroshi Kamiya)Tonari no Kaibutsu-kun ~ Drama CD｢Ore to Bat to Tama to Ore｣Vitamin X ~ OAD Addiction ~ Character song 02｢100V no Ai Shogeki｣
｢100V no Ai Shogeki ~ びた★ぱら Re-Mix☆EXTREAM｣Vitamin X Addiction ~ Ending Theme 1｢Gakuen Frontier ~ Tsubasa & Hajime｣(with Tatsuhisa Suzuki)
｢Gakuen Frontier ~ Hajime Ver.｣Vitamin X Addiction ~ Opening Theme｢Dekiai X ~ Tsubasa & Hajime｣ (with Tatsuhisa Suzuki)
｢Dekiai X ~ Hajime Ver.｣Vitamin X to Z ~ RED-SKY｢ENDLESS SKY｣ (Daisuke Ono & Tomoaki Maeno)
｢ENDLESS SKY ~ Hajime Ver.｣Working'!! ~ Ending Theme ｢Itsumo you ni LOVE & PEACE!!｣ (with Jun Fukuyama & Kamiya Hiroshi)WORKING!! きゃらそん☆MENU 06｢SUGAR & SPICE｣
｢Wagnaria Sanka ~ A Day of Sato Jun｣

2012Brave 10｢Seirei Hirai｣
｢Seirei Hirai bravery mix｣(with Tetsuya Kakihara)K vol.1 Bonus CD｢レジェンド台所｣Kuroko No Basuke ~ Solo  Series Vol.4 ~ Midorima Shintarou｢狙い通りのDestiny｣
｢曰く蟹座の吉日に｣Kuroko no Basuke Duet Series vol.3 ｢とある信者の果敢な毎日｣(Daisuke Ono & Tatsuhisa Suzuki)
｢明日へ連れて｣(Daisuke Ono & Tatsuhisa Suzuki)
｢とある信者の果敢な毎日 ~Takao Off Ver.~｣Kuroko No Basuke ~ Vol.4 Special CD feat. Midorima Shintarou｢Seishun TIP-OFF!!~ MVP Midorima ver.｣Mobile Suit Gundam AGE ~ Character Song Album Vol.1｢PRIDE OF WHITE｣Mobile Suit Gundam AGE ~ Character Song Album Vol.2｢SOUL OF WHITE.｣Vitamin Series ~ That's Entertainment!B6&T6 SHOW ＃1～翼と葛城／一と鳳～ (2012-07-11)｢あなたの瞳の中の消しゴム～記憶喪失な夜～｣(Daisuke Ono & Kazuhiko Inoue)VitaminX Character Song CD ~ That's Entertainment!B6&T6 SHOW #4 ～VitaminXのテーマ／永田～(2012-08-22)
｢ENDLESS X!!!｣(with Tatsuhisa Suzuki, Kosuke Toriumi, Hiroyuki Yoshino, Daisuke Kishio & Hisayoshi Suganuma)Vitamin X ~ Detective B6 「 Agent √CODE」｢探偵 √CODE｣(Daisuke Ono & Tatsuhisa Suzuki)
｢ANOTHER WORLD｣(Daisuke Ono & Tatsuhisa Suzuki)
｢ANOTHER WORLD ~ Hajime Ver｣VS/Sweet nest｢VS｣(Daisuke Ono & Takayuki Kondo)
｢Sweet nest｣(Daisuke Ono & Takayuki Kondo)Yozakura Quartet ~ character song album｢phaser braver｣おれパラ ~ 5th Anniversary ALBUM おれクル?｢眠るものたちへ～おれパラver～｣
｢Galaxy Bus｣

2013Brothers Conflict Ending Theme (2013/07/31)
｢14 to 1｣ (ASAHINA Bros.+JULI)Disney Date Koe no Oujisama ~ Special Anniversary Edition｢It's So Much Fun｣
｢Dream goes on ~Magic Key｣ (with Takuma Terashima)
｢Dream goes on ~Magic Key｣ (Ono Daisuke Solo)Ijiin Idol Project Reki Sing ♪ 3 ~ Sakamoto Ryouma｢タイトル未定｣K vol.7 Bonus CD｢Tales of Black dog｣Kamigami no Asobi Character song Apollon & Hades (2013/06/26)
｢絶えない祈り｣Karneval ~ Character Song Vol.3 (2013/07/10)
｢La fin de l'éclipse｣ (with Hirakawa Daisuke)Magi: The Labyrinth of Magic Vol.3 Bonus CD｢Sail for Triumph｣Minami-ke Tadaima ~ Character song Album "Minami-ke no Mina Uta｢LOVE POWER｣
｢Coleslaw no Uta｣
｢Let's Oyasai｣
｢B.B.Q. no Uta｣
｢Christmas no Uta｣New Prince of Tennis ~ THE BEST OF U-17 PLAYERS IX Tokugawa Kazuya (2013/07/24)
｢Survival Destiny｣Shiny x Shiny｢Shiny x Shiny｣ (with Kamiya Hiroshi)Shirokuma Cafe 8th Outro Theme: Lama-San no Lama Mambo｢Lama-San no Lama Mambo｣
｢Shirokuma Cafe ~Lama~｣VitaminR Opening theme｢絶対不滅の愛(ダイヤモンド)｣ (with Tatsuhisa Suzuki)
｢絶対不滅の愛(ダイヤモンド)｣ (Ono Daisuke's solo)

2014Sengoku Musou 4 Ouka Ranman｢Ouju ga Gotoku｣
'"Kamigami no Asobi
 『I Miss You』

2015 (2015/09/11)
｢Eikyuu Paradise｣ (with cast of B-Project) (2015/11/25) (with Daisuke Kishio)
｢Koiseyo Otome｣
｢Karma｣
｢Eikyuu Paradise (Kitakore Ver.)｣
｢Kitakore Secret Talk (Drama Story)｣

2016Mysterious Kiss (2016/04/06) (with Daisuke Kishio)
｢Mysterious Kiss｣
｢Wonderful Days｣ (2016/06/07)
｢Kodō＊Ambitious｣ (with cast of B-Project)
｢｣ (with Daisuke Kishio) (2016/07/27)
｢'｣ (with Daisuke Kishio) (2016/12/21) (with cast of B-Project)
｢Muteki＊Dangerous｣
｢Eikyuu Paradise (14 Vocal Ver.)｣
｢Eikyuu Paradise (Short Size)｣
｢Muteki＊Dangerous -message from B-｣

2017B-Project: Kodō＊Ambitious Volume 6 (2017/01/25)
｢Starrynight Cinderella｣ (2017/03/15) (with Daisuke Kishio)
｢Wonder☆Future｣
｢Vivid Scenery｣Hope Of Mankind (2017/06/21) BLACK (2017/07/19)
｢S-Kyuu Paradise｣ (with cast of B-Project)
｢Muteki＊Dangerous｣ (with cast of B-Project)
｢Karma｣ (with Daisuke Kishio)
｢Mysterious Kiss｣ (with Daisuke Kishio) WHITE''' (2017/07/19)
｢S-Kyuu Paradise｣ (with cast of B-Project)
｢｣ (with Daisuke Kishio)
｢Eikyuu Paradise｣ (with cast of B-Project)
｢Wonder☆Future｣ (with Daisuke Kishio)
｢Wonderful Days｣ (with Daisuke Kishio)
｢Koiseyo Otome｣ (with Daisuke Kishio)

Awards

References

 Nakagami, Yoshikatsu. "The Official Art of AIR". (October 2007) Newtype USA. pp. 135–141.
 Maeda, Hisashi. "The Official Art of The Melancholy of Haruhi Suzumiya". (November 2007) Newtype USA''. pp. 133–139.

External links
 
 

Daisuke Ono at Ryu's Seiyuu Info

1978 births
Living people
Best Actor Seiyu Award winners
Japanese male pop singers
Japanese male video game actors
Japanese male voice actors
Mausu Promotion voice actors
Nihon University alumni
Seiyu Award winners
Male voice actors from Kōchi Prefecture
21st-century Japanese male actors
21st-century Japanese singers
21st-century Japanese male singers
Masochistic Ono Band members